Charles Dearborne Copp (April 12, 1840 to November 2, 1912) was an American soldier who fought in the American Civil War. Copp received the country's highest award for bravery during combat, the Medal of Honor, for his action during the Battle of Fredericksburg in Virginia on 13 December 1862. He was honored with the award on 28 June 1890.

Biography
Copp was born in Warren County, New Hampshire on 12 April 1840. He enlisted into the 9th New Hampshire Infantry. 

After the Civil War, Copp became a companion of the Massachusetts Commandery of the Military Order of the Loyal Legion of the United States.

He died on 2 November 1912 and his remains are interred at the Middle Cemetery in Massachusetts.

Medal of Honor citation

See also

List of American Civil War Medal of Honor recipients: A–F

References

1840 births
1912 deaths
People of New Hampshire in the American Civil War
Union Army officers
United States Army Medal of Honor recipients
American Civil War recipients of the Medal of Honor